the Airbus A330 had been involved in 47 aviation occurrences, including fourteen hull-loss accidents and two hijackings, for a total of 338 fatalities.

History
On 30 June 1994, Airbus Industrie Flight 129, an Airbus A330-321 crashed at the Toulouse-Blagnac Airport while undergoing a test flight to certify its takeoff capability with a single engine failure, killing all 7 people on board. Airbus subsequently advised A330 operators to disconnect the autopilot and limit pitch attitude in the event of an engine failure at low speed.
On 25 May 2000, a Philippine Airlines Airbus A330-301 and operating Flight 812 was hijacked near Antipolo, Rizal, Philippines. The hijacker was killed after jumping out of the aircraft, while the other 277 passengers and all 13 crew aboard survived.
On 13 October 2000, Sabena Flight 689, an A330 was hijacked and ended with no casualties when Spanish police took control of the aircraft.
On 24 July 2001, two unoccupied SriLankan Airlines A330s were destroyed amid an attack on Bandaranaike International Airport, in Colombo, Sri Lanka, by the Liberation Tigers of Tamil Eelam.
On 24 August 2001, Air Transat Flight 236, an A330-200, developed a fuel leak over the Atlantic Ocean due to an incorrectly installed hydraulic part and was forced to glide for over 15 minutes to an emergency landing in the Azores. 18 occupants (16 passengers and two crew members) suffered injuries during the evacuation of the aircraft, with two of them suffering serious injuries.
On 7 October 2008, Qantas Flight 72, an A330-300, suffered a rapid loss of altitude in two sudden uncommanded pitch-down manoeuvres while 150 km (81 nmi) from the Learmonth air base in northern Western Australia. After declaring an emergency, the crew landed the aircraft safely at RAAF Base Learmonth. It was later determined that the incident, which caused 119 injuries, 14 of them serious, was the result of a design flaw of the plane's Air Data Inertial Reference Unit and a limitation of the aircraft's flight computer software.
Malfunctioning pitot tubes provided an early focus for the investigation, as the aircraft involved had Thales-built "–AA" models known to record faulty airspeed data during icing conditions. In July 2009, Airbus advised A330 and A340 operators to replace Thales pitots with equivalents manufactured by Goodrich. Investigators later determined that the inadequate response of the pilots to both a loss of airspeed data and subsequent autopilot disengagement resulted in Flight 447 entering into an aerodynamic stall.
On 25 December 2009, passengers and crew subdued a man who attempted to detonate explosives in his underwear on an A330-300 operating Northwest Airlines Flight 253.
On 13 April 2010, Cathay Pacific Flight 780 suffered a double engine failure due to fuel contamination. The flight was able to make an emergency landing at Hong Kong International Airport. 57 injuries were reported, and all 322 occupants survived.
On 12 May 2010, Afriqiyah Airways Flight 771, an A330-200, crashed on approach to Tripoli International Airport, Libya, on a flight from OR Tambo International Airport, Johannesburg, South Africa. Of the 104 people on board, all perished but one nine-year-old Dutch boy. The cause of the crash was pilot error. Crew resource management was insufficient, sensory illusions, and the first officer's inputs to the aircraft side stick were a contributing factor in the crash. Fatigue was also named as a possible contributing factor in the accident.
On 8 September 2013, Thai Airways International Flight 679, an Airbus A330-300 with 287 passengers and 14 crew members on board, went off the right side of runway 19L at Bangkok-Suvarnabhumi International Airport during its landing roll, causing damage to both engines, the nose gear and the right hand main gear. The evacuation took place at the left side of the aircraft due to fire coming from the right engine and 14 people suffered minor injuries during the evacuation. The aircraft was written off.
 On 3 March 2015, Turkish Airlines Flight 726 departed the runway on landing at Tribhuvan International Airport, Kathmandu, Nepal. The Airbus A330-300 operating the flight, TC-JOC, was severely damaged when its nose gear collapsed, causing damage to the fuselage and both wings. There were 224 passengers and 11 crew members on board; one passenger received minor injuries during the evacuation. The aircraft was written off. TC-JOC was preserved as Aircraft Museum Kathmandu in November 2017.
On 27 August 2019, an Air China A330-300 at Beijing Capital International Airport caught fire while at the gate. The passengers and crew were safely evacuated.  The airplane was likely damaged beyond repair.
On 4 June 2020, a China Airlines Airbus A330-300, registration B-18302 performing flight CI-202 from Shanghai Pudong International Airport (China) to Taipei Songshan Airport (Taiwan) with 87 passengers and 11 crew, landed on Songshan's wet runway 10, when upon touchdown all three primary flight computers, thrust reversers and autobrake systems failed affecting the stopping distance of the aircraft. The crew applied maximum manual braking and managed to stop the aircraft 10 meters/33 feet ahead of the runway end (runway length 2600 meters/8530 feet). The aircraft was towed to the apron.
On 23 October 2022, a Korean Air Airbus A330-322 with registration HL7525 operating as Flight 631 overran the runway at Mactan–Cebu International Airport, following two go-arounds due to wet and windy weather conditions. The aircraft suffered a nose gear collapse and struck a localizer antenna. The aircraft was written off, although no fatalities or injuries were reported.
On 12 December 2022, an Airbus A330neo on delivery to Condor was damaged during manoeuvres on the ground at Toulouse Airport 
On 18 December 2022, a Hawaiian Airlines Airbus A330-243 (registered as N393HA) performing Flight 35 from Phoenix to Honolulu encountered severe turbulence when descending into Honolulu Airport. It was carrying 278 passengers and 10 crew members out of which there were 36 reported injuries with 11 of them serious. The aircraft made a safe landing at 10:46 local time where it was met with emergency personnel.

References

Notes

Airbus A330